Maranta can refer to:

The Marantaceae family of "prayer plants", including arrowroot
Maranta (plant), a genus within that family

Maranta as a personal name may refer to:
In author citation (botany), Maranta is Bartolomeo Maranta, the 16th century botanist for whom the Marantaceae are named and also a literary theorist
Barry Maranta, Australian sports administrator
Lachlan Maranta (born 1992), Australian Rugby League player, Grandson of Barry Maranta
For Edgard Aristide Maranta, see Roman Catholic Diocese of Zanzibar; for Edgar Aristide Maranta (possibly the same person), see Roman Catholic Archdiocese of Dar-es-Salaam
Maranta, a character in the Dragonlance series; see List of minor Dragonlance characters#Kang's Regiment
Luca Maranta, ragazzo italian cousin di Andrea Pauer ( il kamikaze di petardi )